Government High School Chotian is a boarding-cum-day school located in Chotian, Lehragaga, 
Sangrur district, Punjab, India, run by the Department of Education of the Government of Punjab, India. The school is affiliated to the Punjab School Education Board and covered under the Sarva Shiksha Abhiyan scheme run by the Indian Government, which provides free text books and midday meals to all students.

References

External links
 Department of School Education

High schools and secondary schools in Punjab, India
Sangrur district
Educational institutions established in 1976
1976 establishments in Punjab, India